Fingerprint scanners are security systems of biometrics. They are used in police stations, security industries, smartphones, and other mobile devices.

Fingerprints
People have patterns of friction ridges on their fingers, these patterns are called the fingerprints. Fingerprints are uniquely detailed, durable over an individual's lifetime, and difficult to alter. Due to the unique combinations, fingerprints have become an ideal means of identification.

Types of fingerprint scanners
There are four types of fingerprint scanners: optical scanners, capacitance scanners, ultrasonic scanners, and thermal scanners. The basic function of every type of scanner is to obtain an image of a person's fingerprint and find a match for it in its database. The measure of the fingerprint image quality is in dots per inch (DPI).
 Optical scanners take a visual image of the fingerprint using a digital camera.
 Capacitive or CMOS scanners use capacitors and thus electrical current to form an image of the fingerprint. This type of scanner tends to excel in terms of precision.
 Ultrasonic fingerprint scanners use high frequency sound waves to penetrate the epidermal (outer) layer of the skin.
 Thermal scanners sense the temperature differences on the contact surface, in between fingerprint ridges and valleys.

All fingerprint scanners are susceptible to be fooled by a technique that involves photographing fingerprints, processing the photographs using special software, and printing fingerprint replicas using a 3D printer.

Construction forms 

There are two construction forms: the stagnant and the moving fingerprint scanner.

 Stagnant: The finger must be dragged over the small scanning area. This is cheaper and less reliable than the moving form. Imaging can be less than ideal when the finger is not dragged over the scanning area at constant speed.
 Moving: The finger lies on the scanning area while the scanner runs underneath. Because the scanner moves at constant speed over the fingerprint, imaging is superior.

Usage form

Stand-alone readers 
Microsoft released a fingerprint reader in 2005.

Integrated readers 
From early 2000, some laptops with PC Card support can be equipped with readers; for example, Compaq Armada E500 can be optionally equipped by external fingerprint reader since 2000 - the reader module was released by Toshiba. IBM produced laptops with integrated readers since 2004. Apple's marketing name of electronic fingerprint recognition, known as Touch ID, was introduced in 2013 only for smartphones, and laptop option was released only in 2016. The implementation was delayed until 2013 just because the integrated with optical trackpad scanner were be patented by RIM (Blackberry) in 2004. Blackberry produced smartphones with readers since 2010 - the first model with feature was a budget Blackberry Curve.

See also 

Fingerprint#Capture and detection

References

Computer hardware
Fingerprints
Biometrics